Classical mechanics is the branch of physics used to describe the motion of macroscopic objects. It is the most familiar of the theories of physics. The concepts it covers, such as mass, acceleration, and force, are commonly used and known. The subject is based upon a three-dimensional Euclidean space with fixed axes, called a frame of reference. The point of concurrency of the three axes is known as the origin of the particular space.

Classical mechanics utilises many equations—as well as other mathematical concepts—which relate various physical quantities to one another. These include differential equations, manifolds, Lie groups, and ergodic theory. This article gives a summary of the most important of these.

This article lists equations from Newtonian mechanics, see analytical mechanics for the more general formulation of classical mechanics (which includes Lagrangian and Hamiltonian mechanics).

Classical mechanics

Mass and inertia

Derived kinematic quantities

Derived dynamic quantities

General energy definitions

Every conservative force has a potential energy. By following two principles one can consistently assign a non-relative value to U:

 Wherever the force is zero, its potential energy is defined to be zero as well.
 Whenever the force does work, potential energy is lost.

Generalized mechanics

Kinematics

In the following rotational definitions, the angle can be any angle about the specified axis of rotation. It is customary to use θ, but this does not have to be the polar angle used in polar coordinate systems. The unit axial vector

defines the axis of rotation,  = unit vector in direction of r,  = unit vector tangential to the angle.

Dynamics

Precession 

The precession angular speed of a spinning top is given by:

where w is the weight of the spinning flywheel.

Energy 

The mechanical work done by an external agent on a system is equal to the change in kinetic energy of the system:

General work-energy theorem (translation and rotation)

The work done W by an external agent which exerts a force F (at r) and torque τ on an object along a curved path C is:

where θ is the angle of rotation about an axis defined by a unit vector n.

Kinetic energy

Elastic potential energy

For a stretched spring fixed at one end obeying Hooke's law:

where r2 and r1 are collinear coordinates of the free end of the spring, in the direction of the extension/compression, and k is the spring constant.

Euler's equations for rigid body dynamics

Euler also worked out analogous laws of motion to those of Newton, see Euler's laws of motion. These extend the scope of Newton's laws to rigid bodies, but are essentially the same as above. A new equation Euler formulated is:

where I is the moment of inertia tensor.

General planar motion

The previous equations for planar motion can be used here: corollaries of momentum, angular momentum etc. can immediately follow by applying the above definitions. For any object moving in any path in a plane,

the following general results apply to the particle.

Central force motion 

For a massive body moving in a central potential due to another object, which depends only on the radial separation between the centers of masses of the two objects, the equation of motion is:

Equations of motion (constant acceleration) 
These equations can be used only when acceleration is constant. If acceleration is not constant then the general calculus equations above must be used, found by integrating the definitions of position, velocity and acceleration (see above).

Galilean frame transforms

For classical (Galileo-Newtonian) mechanics, the transformation law from one inertial or accelerating (including rotation) frame (reference frame traveling at constant velocity - including zero) to another is the Galilean transform.

Unprimed quantities refer to position, velocity and acceleration in one frame F; primed quantities refer to position, velocity and acceleration in another frame F' moving at translational velocity V or angular velocity Ω relative to F. Conversely F moves at velocity (—V or —Ω) relative to F'. The situation is similar for relative accelerations.

Mechanical oscillators

SHM, DHM, SHO, and DHO refer to simple harmonic motion, damped harmonic motion, simple harmonic oscillator and damped harmonic oscillator respectively.

See also

List of physics formulae
Defining equation (physics)
Defining equation (physical chemistry)
Constitutive equation
Mechanics
Optics
Electromagnetism
Thermodynamics
Acoustics
Isaac Newton
List of equations in wave theory
List of relativistic equations
List of equations in fluid mechanics
List of equations in gravitation
List of electromagnetism equations
List of photonics equations
List of equations in quantum mechanics
List of equations in nuclear and particle physics

Notes

References

Classical mechanics
Mathematics-related lists
Classical Mechanics